The Curse of Oak Island is a reality television series that premiered on January 5, 2014. The program features the Oak Island mystery.  The tenth season premiered on November 15, 2022.

Series overview

Beyond Oak Island

Episodes

Season 1 (2014)

Season 2 (2014–15)

Season 3 (2015–16)

Season 4 (2016–17)

Season 5 (2017–18)

Season 6 (2018–19)

Season 7 (2019–20)

Season 8 (2020–21)

Season 9 (2021–22)

Season 10 (2022–23)

Beyond Oak Island

Season 1 (2020–21)

Season 2 (2022)

Season 3 (2022)

References

External links
 
 

Lists of American reality television series episodes